Gerd Heinz (born 21 September 1940) is  a German stage, film and television actor and a stage director. He was also active as an academic teacher and theatre manager (Intendant). From 1989, he turned more towards opera. He staged a drama by Thomas Bernhard at the Salzburg Festival in 2016, and Der Ring in Minden, Wagner's Der Ring des Nibelungen from 2015 to 2018.

Career 
He studied German, philosophy and art history at the University of Cologne.

Heinz began work at the Theater Aachen in 1962, where he played roles such as Tasso and Cyrano de Bergerac. He worked at several theatres, both as an actor and a stage director. He was a professor at the Musikhochschule Hamburg from 1968 to 1978, at times directing the opera class. He became director of drama at the Staatstheater Darmstadt in 1970. From 1973, he regularly directed at the Thalia Theater in Hamburg. He has also worked as an actor in film and television.

From 1982, Heinz was Intendant at the Schauspielhaus Zürich for seven years. In 1997, he was appointed a professor at the Hochschule für Musik Freiburg. Since 2008, he has worked as a freelance director. At the Stadttheater Minden, he staged Wagner's Der Ring des Nibelungen in four consecutive years from 2015 to 2018, concluded by two complete cycles in 2019. A reviewer noted how he achieved great effect by using props sparingly and making efficient use of the limited space, focusing on the psychological aspects of the characters and their relationships.

In 2008, Heinz received the E. T. A.-Hoffmann-Kreisler-Preis.

Literature

References

External links 
 
 
 
 : Laudatio auf Gerd Heinz zur Verleihung des E.T.A.-Hoffmann-Kreisler-Preises in Freiburg on 29 October 2008  eta-hoffmann-stiftung.de

German theatre directors
1940 births
Living people
People from Aachen
University of Cologne alumni
Academic staff of the Hochschule für Musik Freiburg